Haycock may refer to:

Places
 Haycock Island, an island in Queensland, Australia 
 Haycock Township, Bucks County, Pennsylvania, United States
 Haycock, Alaska, United States
 Haycock, Virginia, United States
 Haycock Airport, an airport in Haycock, Alaska, United States
 Haycock (Lake District), a hill in the English Lake District
 Haycock Mountain, a hill in Bucks County, Pennsylvania, United States
 Haycock Mountain, Utah, a mountain located in Garfield County, Utah near Panguitch Lake, with an elevation of approximately 9,000 feet.  Homesteaded by Joseph Haycock.

Other uses
 Haycock (surname)
 Haystack